Wittamer & Co is a notable chocolatier based in Brussels, Belgium.

History 
Whittamer & Co dates back to 1910, when Henri Wittamer opened his boulangerie with his wife Marie on the Place du Grand Sablon. The shop passed on to his son Henri II and his wife Yvonne. In the 1960s, his son, Henri III, and his sister Myriam took over the shop. Henri III had his training as maître chocolatier in Switzerland. The process of manufacturing modernised with new technological developments. In the 1980s, new ideas were introduced. The company expanded and opened its first shop in Kobe, Japan in the 1980s. The company is now run in the fourth generation of the family.

For the wedding of Lady Mathilde d'Udekem d'Acoz to Philippe, Crown Prince of Belgium in December 1999, Wittamer received the honour to create the dessert. The king himself chose the type of cake. Because of the excellence of the product, Wittamer subsequently received a royal warrant of appointment to the Belgian court.

The original Wittamer café is still located on 6 Place du Grand Sablon. A larger shop on 12 was opened down the same row which offers a wider choice and variety of chocolates and Belgian pralines.

See also 
 Neuhaus (chocolatier)
 Belgian chocolate

External links 

Official homepage of Wittamer & Co

Belgian brands
Belgian Royal Warrant holders
Belgian chocolate companies
Food and drink companies based in Brussels
Manufacturing companies based in Brussels